Samantabhadra (1891-1988) was a Digambara monk.

Biography
Founder of Jain Gurukul Education system Gurudev 108 Shri Samantabhadra was born in Karmala, Maharashtra on 19 December 1891.
Birth name was  Devchand Kasturchand Shah.

Notes

References
 

1891 births
1988 deaths
Indian Jain monks
20th-century Indian Jains
20th-century Jain monks
20th-century Indian monks